Hirji Kenia Jayantilal  (born 13 January 1948) is a former Indian cricketer who played in one Test match in 1971.

On his Ranji Trophy debut, he scored 153 runs against Andhra.

He only played one Test match in 1971 against West Indies, where he scored five runs. He was a substitute for Sunil Gavaskar as the latter was injured.

External links 
 

1948 births
Living people
India Test cricketers
Indian cricketers
Hyderabad cricketers
South Zone cricketers
Indian Universities cricketers
Cricketers from Hyderabad, India